New Pitsligo, also known as Cavoch (locally Cyaak), is a village in Aberdeenshire, Scotland, quite near Fraserburgh.

Overview
It has a sub-post office located in a convenience shop, a chip shop, tandoori restaurant and a Chinese takeaway. There is also a public library and a doctor's surgery. There are several parks in the village, two pubs, a car sales garage and a MOT and repair garage.

Pitsligo Arms Hotel, on High Street, was built in 1790 to provide accommodation for William Forbes upon his visits. 

By 1864, the village had just under two thousand inhabitants; as of 2006, it was 907.

New Pitsligo is built on Turlundie Hill leading down to the valley between it and Balnamoon Hill. It looks on to Mormond Hill.

History
The local area to the immediate south is rich with prehistory and historical features. There are found a number of prehistoric monuments including Catto Long Barrow, Silver Cairn and numerous tumuli. In that same vicinity of the Laeca Burn watershed is the point d'appui of historic battles between invading Danes and indigenous Picts.

Pitsligo was an area originally owned by the Lords Pitsligo, however after the Jacobite rising of 1745 these lands were forfeited because of the last Lord's support for the losing side. Part of the estate eventually passed to William Forbes of Monymusk who founded the village of New Pitsligo on the site of the existing hamlet of Cyaak. The boundaries of the original hamlet run roughly from the woods, where the small stream runs through the village, north towards the Fraserburgh end of the village. However now the village as a whole is referred under this name.

Recreation
Although it is one of the bigger villages within the area, recreational facilities are limited. There is the village hall, which can be rented out to use for clubs and holds the long-standing Visual Arts Exhibition.

There is a football pitch, situated next to Low Street, which has changing rooms on site. Also below there is a second field, which in years past has been used as a playing field for youngsters and was provided with goals including nets. However these no longer exist. There is a third, small football pitch in one of the fields behind the school, which has recently been upgraded.

There are no tennis facilities, despite these existing in the nearby villages of Strichen and Longside which have smaller populations.

There is a local Freemason's Lodge which is situated in School Street.  Established in 1872.

Employment
Historically, many people from the village were employed in quarrying for granite.

Also, many people worked on the peat moss which lies in the area between the east of the village and Strichen.

The village is also famous for New Pitsligo lace.

Notable people

 Robert Gordon Wilson (1844–1931) eminent Scottish church architect born and raised here
 Bill Gibb (1943-1988) fashion designer
 Andy Duguid (1982- ) Trance musician originally from Germany, who has lived in Scotland since 1990

References

Bibliography
 

Villages in Aberdeenshire